The 1992–93 Polska Liga Hokejowa season was the 58th season of the Polska Liga Hokejowa, the top level of ice hockey in Poland. 10 teams participated in the league, and Podhale Nowy Targ won the championship.

First round

Final round

Qualification round

Playoffs

Relegation 
 Stocznowiec Gdansk - Mosir Sosnowiec 2:2/3:2

External links
 Season on hockeyarchives.info

1992-93
Pol
Polska